Pigs in blankets or kilted soldiers is a dish served in the United Kingdom and Ireland consisting of small sausages (usually chipolatas) wrapped in bacon. They are a popular and traditional accompaniment to roast turkey in a Christmas dinner and are served as a side dish.

Description and history 
Pigs in blankets is a dish served in the United Kingdom and Ireland consisting of small sausages (usually chipolatas) wrapped in bacon.

The first recipes appeared in 1957, and the dish was popularized in the 1990s by Delia Smith, who included a recipe in a cook book. The first commercially produced versions appeared around the same time.

In general it is a seasonal item, seldom offered commercially outside the Christmas season, and it has spawned food-industry offshoot products such as pigs-in-blankets flavoured mayonnaise, peanuts, chips, vaping liquid, and chocolates as well as versions of Christmas-associated consumer items such as pajamas made with a pigs-in-blankets print. Tesco in 2019 reported that a majority of shoppers they surveyed planned to serve the dish at Christmas dinner and that more planned to serve pigs in blankets than any other side dish, including Yorkshire pudding, another traditional Christmas dish.

Ingredients, preparation, and serving 
Traditionally the sausage used is a cocktail-sized pork-based chipolata and the wrapping a streaky bacon, but variations include those using chorizo or chicken sausage, using sausages with added ingredients such as apples or chestnuts, using full-sized chipolatas, or using flavored or smoked bacon. Commercially available varieties may have around 325 calories and 22 g of fat per 100 g serving.

The wrapped sausages may be pan-fried, baked, or a combination.

They are a popular and traditional accompaniment to roast turkey in a Christmas dinner and are served as a side dish. They may also be served on Boxing Day.

Importance 
According to Good Housekeeping and Yahoo News, they are considered a staple of the Christmas season. One online butcher promotes a National Pigs in Blankets Day each December since 2013.

Similar dishes 

In Denmark, there is a bacon-wrapped sausage served in a bun known as the Pølse i svøb, which means "sausage in blanket", usually sold at hot dog stands known as pølsevogne (sausage-wagons).

In Luxembourg,  is a scalded sausage filled with cheese and wrapped in bacon.

Similarly named dishes 
The American dish pigs in a blanket is sometimes confused with this dish, but their only similarity is the name and the fact the foundation ingredient is a wrapped sausage; the US dish wraps the sausage in bread or pastry dough.

In some parts of the US heavily influenced by Polish immigration, "pigs in a blanket" may refer to stuffed cabbage rolls, such as the Polish gołąbki.

See also 

 Bacon wrapped food
 Devils on horseback, another bacon-wrapped dish commonly served in British households at Christmas time
 List of Christmas dishes
 List of stuffed dishes

References 

British cuisine
Christmas food
Sausage dishes
Stuffed dishes
Bacon dishes
Irish cuisine